Anumeta is a genus of moths in the family Erebidae.

Species
 Anumeta arax Fibiger, 1995
 Anumeta arabiae Wiltshire, 1961
 Anumeta arenosa Brandt, 1939
 Anumeta asiatica Wiltshire, 1961
 Anumeta atrosignata Walker, 1858
 Anumeta azelikoula Dumont, 1920
 Anumeta cashmiriensis (Hampson, 1894)
 Anumeta cestina (Staudinger, 1884)
 Anumeta cestis (Ménétriés, 1848)
 Anumeta ciliaria (Ménétriés, 1849)
 Anumeta comosa Dumont, 1920
 Anumeta dentistrigata (Staudinger, 1877)
 Anumeta eberti Wiltshire, 1961
 Anumeta fractistrigata (Alphéraky, 1882)
 Anumeta fricta (Christoph, 1893)
 Anumeta henkei (Staudinger, 1877)
 Anumeta hilgerti (Rothschild, 1909)
 Anumeta major Rothschild, 1913
 Anumeta palpangularis (Püngeler, 1901)
 Anumeta quatuor Berio, 1934
 Anumeta sabulosa Rothschild, 1913
 Anumeta spatzi Rothschild, 1915
 Anumeta spilota (Erschoff, 1874)
 Anumeta straminea (Bang-Haas, 1906)
 Anumeta surcoufi Dumont, 1920
 Anumeta zaza Wiltshire, 1961

References
 Anumeta at Markku Savela's Lepidoptera and Some Other Life Forms
 Natural History Museum Lepidoptera genus database

Toxocampinae
Moth genera